Myrmica spatulata is a species of ant in the family Formicidae. It is found in the forests of the middle and eastern part of the United States.

References

Further reading

 
 
 
 
 

Myrmica
Insects described in  1930